Linhof is a German company, founded in Munich in 1887 by Valentin Linhof.  The company is well known for making premium rollfilm and large format film cameras.  Linhof initially focused on making camera shutters and developing the first leaf shutter, which became part of Compur.

Nikolaus Karpf, who entered the company in 1934, designed the first Technika model, the world's first all-metal folding field camera, the same year.  Revised models of the Technika are still in production.

Today Linhof is the oldest still-producing camera manufacturer in the world after Gandolfi and Kodak stopped their production.

Products

Folding bed field cameras

6x9 cm
See also Linhof 6x9.
 Linhof Ur-Technika (1934)
 Linhof Technika
 Linhof Technika III, with or without RF
 Linhof Technika IV
 Linhof Super Technika IV
 Linhof Technika 70
 Linhof Studienkamera 70
 Linhof Super Technika V = Super Technika 23
 Linhof Technikardan 23S
 Linhof Techno

9x12 cm
 Linhof Technika II (1937–1943)

4x5 in.
 Linhof 34 (1934–1936)
 Linhof Technika Medizin (1937–1943)
 Linhof Standard Press
 Linhof Technika III, with or without RF
 Linhof Technika IV
 Linhof Super Technika IV
 Linhof Technika V
 Linhof Super Technika V
 Linhof Master Technika = Master Technika Classic
 Linhof Master Technika 2000
 Linhof Master Technika 3000
 Linhof Technikardan 45
 Linhof TechniKardan 45S
 Linhof TechniKardan 23
 Linhof TechniKardan 23S

13x18
 Linhof Technika
 Linhof Technika III, with or without RF
 Linhof Super Technika V

18x24
 Linhof Präzisionskamera 18x24 (Technika) (1937–1943) only 10 items made
 Linhof Präzisionskamera 18x24 (Technika "Medizin" in grey) only 1 item made (pre-owner: famous German photographer Adolf Lazi and Franz Lazi)

Monorail view cameras
 Linhof Color 4x5 (inches)
 Linhof Kardan 4x5
 Linhof Kardan Colour 4x5
 Linhof Technikardan s45 4x5
 Linhof Bi
 Linhof Super Color
 Linhof Super Color JBL
 Linhof TL
 Linhof GT
 Linhof GTL
 Linhof Kardan E
 Linhof Kardan M
 Linhof Kardan TE
 Linhof Technikardan s23 2x3 (inches)
 Linhof TechniKardan 45
 Linhof TechniKardan 45S
 Linhof M679 6x9
 Linhof M679cc 6x9
 Linhof M679cs 6x9

Rigid body cameras
 Linhof Technika Press
 Linhof Weitwinkelkamera 65
 Linhof Press 70
 Linhof 220
 Linhof 220 PL
 Linhof 220 RS
 Linhof Technar 45 (4x5)

Panoramic

6x12 
 Technorama 612PC
 Technorama 612PC II
 Technorama 612PC III

6x17
 Technorama
 Technorama 617S
 Technorama 617S III

Aerial photography
 Aero Press
 Electric 70
 Aerotronica 69 (6x9
 Aero Technika (4x5")
 Aero Technika 45 (4x5")
 Aero Technika 45EL (4x5")
 Aero Technika 18x24

Photogrammetry, 4x5 in.
 Metrika 45
 Metrika 45R

Digital Platform
 Linhof Techno
 Linhof M 679cs

Accessories
 tripods (disconnected)
 ballheads
 Linhof Levelling Pan/Tilt Heads
 Linhof quicklock tripod connector Quickfix

References

Bibliography
 The Linhof camera story, edited by the company

External links
 
 Linhof review at photo.net

Photography companies of Germany
Manufacturing companies based in Munich